The 2021–22 season was the 103rd season in the existence of AS Saint-Étienne and the club's 18th consecutive season in the top flight of French football. In addition to the domestic league, Saint-Étienne participated in this season's editions of the Coupe de France.

On 29 May 2022, the club's relegation to the second division was confirmed after 18 years in the top tier.

Players

First-team squad
As of 4 February 2022.

Out on loan

Transfers

In

Out

Pre-season and friendlies

Competitions

Overall record

Ligue 1

League table

Results summary

Results by round

Matches
The league fixtures were announced on 25 June 2021.

Relegation play-offs

Coupe de France

Statistics

Goalscorers

References

AS Saint-Étienne seasons
Saint-Étienne